Isus or Isos was a town in ancient Boeotia, near Anthedon, that in the time of Strabo had vestiges of a more ancient city, which some commentators identified with the Nisa referred to by Homer in the Catalogue of Ships in the Iliad.

Its site is located near modern Pirgos.

References

Populated places in ancient Boeotia
Former populated places in Greece